MyNetworkTV is an American television programming service made up of 11 owned-and-operated stations controlled by the Fox Television Stations division of Fox Corporation and 186 affiliates. As of November 1, 2022, twenty-five media markets lack their own in-market over-the-air MyNetworkTV affiliate, with twelve media markets served by nearby affiliates outside their market through cable and satellite services.

A blue background indicates a station transmitting in the ATSC 3.0 format over-the-air; details about the station's alternate availability in the original ATSC format are contained in its article.

Owned-and-operated stations 
Stations are listed in alphabetical order by state and city of license. Owned-and-operated stations broadcasting on digital subchannels are italicized.

Affiliate stations

Current affiliates

Former affiliates

Notes

Operational agreements

Primary and secondary affiliations

Miscellany

References

External links
Press release announcing network
Official MNTV local affiliate list

Corporation-related lists
Lists of American television network affiliates